Lamida mediobarbalis is a species of snout moth in the genus Lamida. It is known from India.

References

Moths described in 1916
Epipaschiinae